The Poor Relief Act 1601 (43 Eliz 1 c 2) was an Act of the Parliament of England. The Act for the Relief of the Poor 1601, popularly known as the Elizabethan Poor Law, "43rd Elizabeth" or the Old Poor Law was passed in 1601 and created a poor law system for England and Wales.

It formalised earlier practices of poor relief distribution in England and Wales and is generally considered a refinement of the Act for the Relief of the Poor 1597 that established Overseers of the Poor. The "Old Poor Law" was not one law but a collection of laws passed between the 16th and 18th centuries. The system's administrative unit was the parish.  It was not a centralised government policy but a law which made individual parishes responsible for Poor Law legislation. The 1601 act saw a move away from the more obvious forms of punishing paupers under the Tudor system towards methods of "correction".

Several amending pieces of legislation can be considered part of the Old Poor Law. These include:

1662 – Poor Relief Act 1662 (Settlement Acts)
1723 – Workhouse Test Act
1782 – Gilbert's Act
1795 – Speenhamland

Origins

The origins of the Old Poor Law extend back into the 15th century with the decline of the monasteries and the breakdown of the medieval social structure. Charity was gradually replaced with a compulsory land tax levied at parish level.

Main points of the 1601 Act
The impotent poor (people who can't work) were to be cared for in almshouse or a poorhouse. The law offered relief to people who were unable to work: mainly those who were "lame, impotent, old, blind".
The able-bodied poor were to be set to work in a house of industry. Materials were to be provided for the poor to be set to work.
The idle poor and vagrants were to be sent to a house of correction or even prison.
Pauper children would become apprentices.

Text of the Act Reginae Elizabethae Anno 43 Chapter 2

Description
Relief under the Old Poor Law could take on one of two forms – indoor relief, relief inside a workhouse, or outdoor relief, relief in a form outside a workhouse. This could come in the form of money, food or even clothing. As the cost of building the different workhouses was great, outdoor relief continued to be the main form of relief in this period.

Relief for those too ill or old to work, the so-called "impotent poor", was in the form of a payment or items of food ("the parish loaf") or clothing also known as outdoor relief. Some aged people might be accommodated in parish alms houses, though these were usually private charitable institutions. Meanwhile, able-bodied beggars who had refused work were often placed in houses of correction (indoor relief). However, provision for the many able-bodied poor in the workhouse, which provided accommodation at the same time as work, was relatively unusual, and most workhouses developed later. The 1601 Law said that poor parents and children were responsible for each other – elderly parents would live with their children.

The 1601 Poor Law could be described as "parochial" as the administrative unit of the system was the parish. There were around 1,500 such parishes based upon the area around a parish church. This system allowed greater sensitivity towards paupers, but also made tyrannical behaviour from overseers possible. Overseers of the poor would know their paupers and so be able to differentiate between the "deserving" and "undeserving" poor. The Elizabethan Poor Law operated at a time when the population was small enough for everyone to know everyone else, so people's circumstances would be known and the idle poor would be unable to claim on the parishes' poor rate.

The act levied a poor rate on each parish which overseers of the poor were able to collect. Those who had to pay this rate were property owners, or rather, in most cases, occupiers including tenants.

The 1601 Act sought to deal with "settled" poor who had found themselves temporarily out of work – it was assumed they would accept indoor relief or outdoor relief. Neither method of relief was at this time in history seen as harsh. The act was supposed to deal with beggars who were considered a threat to civil order. The act was passed at a time when poverty was considered necessary as it was thought that only fear of poverty made people work.

In 1607 a house of correction was set up in each county. However, this system was separate from the 1601 system which distinguished between the settled poor and "vagrants".

Criticisms of the 1601 Act

Implementation and variation
There was much variation in the application of the law and there was a tendency for the destitute to migrate towards the more generous parishes, usually situated in the towns. There was wide variation in the amount of poor relief given out. As the parish was the administrative unit of the system there was great diversity in the system. Since there were no administrative standards, parishes were able to interpret the law as they wished.
Some cities, such as Bristol, Exeter and Liverpool were able to obtain by-laws which established their control onto several of the urban parishes within their jurisdiction. Bristol gained a private Act of Parliament in 1696 which allowed the city to create a 'manufactory' so that the profits from the paupers' work could be used for maintenance of the poor relief system.

Outdoor relief

Outdoor relief continued to be the most popular form of relief for the able-bodied poor even though the law described that "the poor should be set to work". In 1795 the Speenhamland system was introduced as a system of outdoor relief.  Again, there was variation within the system with some parishes subsidising with food and others with money. Some parishes were more generous than others so there was no uniformity to the system. The Speenhamland system was popular in the south of England.  Elsewhere the Roundsman and Labour rate were used. The system was designed for a pre-industrial society, industrialisation, a mobile population, a series of bad harvests during the 1790s and the Napoleonic Wars tested the old poor law to the breaking point.

Settlement

The 1601 Act states that each individual parish was responsible for its 'own' poor.  Arguments over which parish was responsible for a pauper's poor relief and concerns over migration to more generous parishes led to the passing of the Settlement Act 1662 which allowed relief only to established residents of a parish – mainly through birth, marriage and apprenticeship. A pauper applicant had to prove a 'settlement’. If unable to, they were removed to the next parish that was nearest to the place of their birth, or where they might prove some connection. Some paupers were moved hundreds of miles. Although each parish that they passed through was not responsible for them, they were supposed to supply food and drink and shelter for at least one night.

Individual parishes were keen to keep costs of poor relief as low as possible and there are examples of paupers in some cases being shunted back and forth between parishes.  The Settlement Laws allowed strangers to a parish to be removed after 40 days if they were not working, but the cost of removing such people meant that they were often left until they tried to claim poor relief. In 1697 Settlement Laws were tightened when people could be barred from entering a parish unless they produced a Settlement certificate.

Effect on the labour market
The Act was criticised in later years for its distortion of the labour market, through the power given to parishes to let them remove 'undeserving' poor. Another criticism of the Act was that it applied to rated land not personal or movable wealth, therefore benefiting commercial and business interests.

Cost
The building of different types of workhouses was expensive. The Workhouse Act of 1772 allowed parishes to combine and apply for a workhouse test, where conditions were made worse than those outside.

The Act stated that workhouses, poorhouses and houses of correction should be built for the different types of pauper. However, it was not cost-effective to build these different types of buildings. For this reason parishes such as Bristol combined these institutions so that the profits paupers made were plunged back into the maintenance of the system.

Reliance on the parish
The system's reliance on the parish can be seen as both a strength and a weakness. It could be argued it made the system more humane and sensitive, but a local crisis such as a poor harvest could be a great burden on the local poor rate.

Variation from the system
The 18th-century workhouse movement began at the end of the 17th century with the establishment of the Bristol Corporation of the Poor, founded by act of parliament in 1696.  The corporation established a workhouse which combined housing and care of the poor with a house of correction for petty offenders.  Following the example of Bristol, twelve more towns and cities established similar corporations in the next two decades.  Because these corporations required a private act, they were not suitable for smaller towns and individual parishes.

Starting with the parish of Olney, Buckinghamshire in 1714, several dozen small towns and individual parishes established their own institutions without any specific legal authorization. These were concentrated in the South Midlands and in the county of Essex.  From the late 1710s the Society for the Promotion of Christian Knowledge began to promote the idea of parochial workhouses.

Knatchbull's Act

The Society published several pamphlets on the subject, and supported Sir Edward Knatchbull in his successful efforts to steer the Workhouse Test Act through Parliament in 1723. The act gave legislative authority for the establishment of parochial workhouses, by both single parishes and as joint ventures between two or more parishes.  More importantly, the Act helped to publicise the idea of establishing workhouses to a national audience. The Workhouse Test Act made workhouses a deterrent as conditions were to be regulated to make them worse than outside of the workhouse. However, during this period outdoor relief was still the most popular method of poor relief as it was easier to administer.

By 1776 some 1,912 parish and corporation workhouses had been established in England and Wales, housing almost 100,000 paupers.  Although many parishes and pamphlet writers expected to earn money from the labour of the poor in workhouses, the vast majority of people obliged to take up residence in workhouses were ill, elderly, or children whose labour proved largely unprofitable.  The demands, needs and expectations of the poor also ensured that workhouses came to take on the character of general social policy institutions, combining the functions of crèche, night shelter, geriatric ward and orphanage.

Gilbert's Act

Gilbert's Act was passed in 1782 to combat the excessive costs of outdoor relief. It promoted indoor alternatives and allowed parishes to combine to support the impotent poor. However, outdoor relief was still used to help the able-bodied poor.

Overhaul

Industrialisation
The 1601 system was for a pre-industrial society and the massive population increases after the Industrial Revolution strained the existing system. Mechanisation meant that unemployment was increasing, therefore poor relief costs could not be met.

French Wars
The French Revolutionary Wars and Napoleonic Wars occurred in 1792–1797, 1798–1801, 1805–1807, and 1813–1814, and ended after the Battle of Waterloo in 1815. The wars meant that there were periods of trade blockades on Britain which prevented Britain from importing large amounts of grain, thus raising the price of bread. The blockades coupled with poor harvests in 1813 and 1814 kept the price of bread high.

After the war cheap imports returned. Many farmers went bankrupt because poor rate remained high. Farmers also had to pay war-time taxes. Resulting bankruptcies caused rural workers to become unemployed, and many farmers that survived lowered their workers' wages.

The Corn Laws were passed by the Tory government of Lord Liverpool to protect British farmers. Imports could not occur until prices had reached 80 shillings a quarter. This aimed to prevent both grain prices and wages from fluctuating. However, this kept prices artificially high and made more people claim poor relief. Returning soldiers further added to pressures on the Poor Law system. Further poor harvests in 1818 and 1819 meant that the costs of poor relief hit £8m during this period.

Corruption
In 1819 select vestries were established.  These were committees set up in each parish which were responsible for Poor Law administration. There were concerns over corruption within the system as contracts for supplying food and beer often went to local traders or these vestries.

Cost
The cost of the current system was increasing from the late 18th century into the 19th century. Although outdoor relief was cheaper than building workhouses, the numbers claiming outdoor relief increased. The increasing numbers of people claiming relief peaked after the economic dislocation caused by the French Wars when it was 12 shillings per head of population. During this period strain was also put on the system by a population increase from 9 million to 14 million in the time period indicated by the graph.

Unrest
One reason for changing the system was to prevent unrest or even revolution. Habeas Corpus was suspended and the Six Acts passed to prevent possible riots. The Swing Riots highlighted the possibility of agricultural unrest.

Criticism from leading intellectuals

Jeremy Bentham argued for a disciplinary, punitive approach to social problems, whilst the writings of Thomas Malthus focused attention on the problem of overpopulation, and the growth of illegitimacy.  David Ricardo argued that there was an "iron law of wages".  The effect of poor relief, in the view of the reformers, was to undermine the position of the "independent labourer".

Reform
The 1832 Royal Commission into the Operation of the Poor Laws wrote a report stating the changes which needed to be made to the poor. These changes were implemented in the Poor Law Amendment Act 1834, popularly known as the New Poor Law and aimed at restricting intervention to indoor relief.

Repeal
The whole Act was repealed by section 117 of, and Part I of Schedule 14 to, the General Rate Act 1967.

Historiography
The Historian Mark Blaug has defended the Old Poor Law system and criticised the Poor Law Amendment Act. Evidence to the 1837 Committee on the Poor Law Amendment Act also found some support for the existing system.

See also
UK labour law 
Poor Law

References

Further reading
A.L. Beier, Masterless Men: The Vagrancy Problem in England, 1560–1640 (1985)
A.L. Beier,The Problem of the Poor in Tudor and Stuart England (1983)
N. Fellows, Disorder & Rebellion in Tudor England (2001)
Steve Hindle, The State and Social Change in Early Modern England (2000)
John F Pound, Poverty and Vagrancy in Tudor England (1971)
Paul Slack, From Reformation to Improvement: Public Welfare in Early Modern England (1998)
Paul Slack, Poverty and Policy in Tudor England (1988)
Penry Williams, The Tudor Regime (1979)

External links
Vicrtorianwebs article on the 1601 Act
The text of the Act
A history of the Poor Laws
The Old Poor Law in England
British social policy, 1601–1948
Evidence of support for the old poor law system
An Educational game relating to the Elizabethan Poor Law
Text of the Act in Modern English

1601 in English law
Acts of the Parliament of England (1485–1603)
English Poor Laws